Split level may refer to:
 Split Level, an Irish Christian rock band active 1986–2000
 A split-level home
 A split level bus
 A bilevel rail car